Arusha City is a Tanzanian city and the regional capital of the Arusha Region, with a population of 2,356,255   (2022 census). 

Located below Mount Meru on the eastern edge of the eastern branch of the Great Rift Valley, Arusha City has a temperate climate. The city is close to the Serengeti National Park, the Ngorongoro Conservation Area, Lake Manyara National Park, Olduvai Gorge, Tarangire National Park, Mount Kilimanjaro, and Mount Meru in the Arusha National Park.  

The city is a major international diplomatic hub. It hosts the African Court of the African Union and is the capital of the East African Community. From 1994 to 2015, the city also hosted the International Criminal Tribunal for Rwanda, but that entity has ceased operations. It is a multicultural city with a majority Tanzanian population of mixed backgrounds: indigenous African, Arab-Tanzanian and Indian-Tanzanian population, plus a small European and North American minority population. Religions of the Arusha city population include Christianity, Islam, Sikhism and Hinduism.

History

The current site of Arusha was first settled in the 1830s by the agro-pastoral Arusha Maasai from the Arusha Chini community, south of Mount Kilimanjaro. They traded grains, honey, beer, and tobacco with the pastoral Kisongo Maasai in exchange for livestock, milk, meat, and skins. Demand for Arusha's foodstuffs increased substantially during the 1860s when the Pangani Valley trade route was extended through Old Moshi, Arusha, and ultimately to western Kenya. Although not yet a town, it was a regional centre with  a number of urban features.

Arusha was conquered by the Germans in 1896 after the murder of the first two missionaries who attempted to settle on nearby Mount Meru. The Germans established a permanent presence in 1900 when a military fort (a boma) was built and soldiers were garrisoned there. "The boma was a solid statement, meant to impress German moral and political order on the surrounding countryside. Set on a rise overlooking the plains, the fortress-like building dominated the surrounding landscape" complete with a machine gun. 

Many Africans were forcibly displaced from their ancestral lands by the Germans and forced to dig lime or carry stones to construct the fort. The British took Arusha from the Germans in 1916 during World War I. German officials left the area, the British deported German missionaries and settlers, and only a skeletal military administration of the town remained. 

During the 1920s, civilian administration was implemented, missionaries from the United States arrived, British and Greek settlers reoccupied the former German farms, and the town grew, especially after the British moved the regional administration from New Moshi to Arusha. The extension of the railroad from Moshi to Arusha in 1928-29 greatly increased commerce. The Great Depression soon squelched commerce and Arusha in 1940 had fewer than 2,000 residents. Growth resumed during World War II and by 1948, the population had increased to more than 5,000. 

By the 1950s, Arusha was "a polyglot, westernized little town; it has a Greek community, several Germans predating World War I, and some German Jewish refugees post-dating World War II." A state of emergency was declared in the Arusha region in 1953 in response to the Mau Mau Uprising. Journalist John Gunther noted at the time that "a loyal tribe, the Waarusha, threatened to take violent countermeasures against the Kikuyus themselves, if the British did not. The authorities arrested the leading Mau Mau conspirators, screened thousands more, and deported other thousands back to Kenya."

In the 1960s parts of the movie Hatari! with John Wayne were filmed at Momela Lakes and at Mount Meru.

Arusha has been a crucial city in the history of modern Tanzania. Official documents ceding independence to Tanganyika were signed by the United Kingdom at Arusha in 1961. The Arusha Declaration was signed in 1967 in Arusha. The Arusha Accords were signed at the city of Arusha on 4 August  1993, by representatives of competing factions in the Rwandan civil war.

The Arusha Peace and Reconciliation Agreement for Burundi was signed on 28 August 2000 as part of a process forging peace in that country through power sharing and establishing a transitional government. 

The January 2015 Arusha Agreement for South Sudan created a framework for the reunification of South Sudan's ruling SPLM party, which had splintered into three creating a humanitarian crisis as fighting between factions intensified. It provided that all SPLM members who were dismissed be reinstated to their previous positions and a secret ballot system be adopted.

In 1994 the UN Security Council decided by its Resolution 955 of 8 November 1994 that Arusha should host the International Criminal Tribunal for Rwanda. The establishment of the tribunal with its foreign employees has influenced the local economy of the city increasing the cost of living for residents. The tribunal has downsized due to its closure in 2014, but its legal successor, the International Residual Mechanism for Criminal Tribunals established by United Nations Security Council Resolution 1966, will continue entertaining a branch in Arusha, opening on 1 July 2012. The tribunal indicted 93 individuals and sentenced 62.

Arusha was officially declared a city on 1 July 2006 by the Tanzanian government. 

In 2013, a quarry located in Arusha collapsed and killed 14 miners after heavy rain.

Intergovernmental organisations 
Arusha is home to a number of notable intergovernmental organisations. The city of Arusha is the headquarters of the East African Community, hosts a branch of the International Residual Mechanism for Criminal Tribunals, and the African Court on Human and Peoples' Rights.

Transport

Airport 

The airport provides international and domestic flights. Arusha Airport is a regional air hub in the west of the city, and serves more than 87,000 passengers yearly.

Road links
Travel by road can be done through privately run coaches (buses) to Nairobi, Dodoma, Babati, Morogoro, Tanga, Mbeya, Singida, Tabora, Mpanda, Kigoma, Mwanza, Bukoba, Iringa, and Dar es Salaam.

Arusha is on the Cape to Cairo Road. There was a marker in the 1930s in Arusha indicating the mid-point of the route. It is also on the Cairo-Cape Town Highway.

Culture
The city hosts the National Natural History Museum, which contains three exhibits on early man, plants and animals of the region, and the history of the city. The Natural National History Museum used to be an administration outpost for the Germans in the 1900s. It was opened in 1987 as a public museum and displays important assets to the scientific community such as models of Australopithecus people, human ancestors that lived over 2 million years ago.

A small museum adjacent to the Uhuru monument displays information about the proceedings of the 1967 Arusha Declaration.

Places of worship 

Among the places of worship, they are predominantly Christian churches and temples: Archdiocese of Arusha, Anglican Church of Tanzania, Evangelical Lutheran Church in Tanzania, Baptist Convention of Tanzania, and Assemblies of God. There are also Muslim mosques.

Education

Most Arushan children attend public schools located in almost every ward of the city. There are five international schools in and around Arusha: International School Moshi (Arusha Campus), Arusha Meru International School, Braeburn School, St Constantine's International School, and Kennedy House International School.

The city of Arusha is home to the National College of Tourism - Arusha Campus, Arusha Technical College, Tengeru Institute of community Development, The Nelson Mandela African Institute of Science and Technology, Eastern and Southern African Management Institute, MS Training Centre for Development Cooperation (MS-TCDC), The Institute of Accountancy Arusha, Forestry Training Institute, Olmotonyi, Tanzania Wildlife Research Institute, Tumaini University Makumira, and The Mount Meru University. 

Arcadia University hosts a film course that has led to the creation of the Arusha African Film Festival, which allows people to come and watch films created by local people. The guidelines allows a multitude of filmmakers to be taken into account for awards, and each year a new theme is chosen for the festival. The AAFF is connected to the East African Film Festival, which also gives ample opportunity for awards and credit to young filmmakers.

Geography and climate

Cool dry air is prevalent for much of the year. It has distinct wet and dry seasons, and experiences an eastern prevailing wind from the Indian Ocean, a few hundred kilometres east. Under the Köppen climate classification system, it has a subtropical highland climate (Cwb). Areas away from Arusha to the south and west are classified as tropical savanna climate (Aw).

Arusha averages 29.8 days per year above  – all between November and March. Areas immediately to the north and northeast of Arusha can see more rain and cooler temperatures due to the influence of Mt. Meru, whose rain shadow extends toward the southeast side of the mountain.

Arusha and the northern highlands of Tanzania experience a bimodal rainfall pattern, with two rainy seasons. Many crops are planted twice per year. The long masika rains from March through May are more reliable in Arusha than in surrounding areas because of the influence of Mt. Meru. The short vuli rains are less reliable, usually coming in November and December. The dry kiangazi season is June to October. 

Higher elevation areas north and northeast of the city are home to farmers growing bananas, coffee, cabbage, potatoes, carrots, leafy greens, and other vegetables.

Cultivation in areas to the northwest, west, southwest, south, and southeast focuses on maize, beans and wheat. There is a significant horticulture industry, with several companies growing flowers for export to Europe.

Sports

The city is home to the Tanzanian rugby national team.  The city hosts international rugby matches as well. Joshua Peterson, who played for the national team, was the second youngest international rugby player ever, behind Jonny Wilkinson. Southern Pool A of the 2007 Castel Beer Trophy was hosted here as well.

The city is home to Arusha FC, playing in Sheikh Amri Abeid Memorial Stadium, which represents the city in Tanzanian league football.

The city also hosted the Mount Meru Marathon, held from 1985 to 2004. The "all-comers" record for the fastest marathon performance in Tanzania, 2:13:46, was set at the event by former long-distance runner Benedict Ako on August 1, 1993.

On 21 May 2011, the Drake Bulldogs beat the CONADEIP All-Stars by 17–7 in the first ever American football game in Tanzania.

Arusha is home for the Arusha Motor Sports Club (AMSC), which provides motor entertainment for the city of Arusha. It was created in 1996 with the purpose of providing "motor rallying", which was a new concept at the time for Tanzania, as a new form of entertainment. The AMSC is the largest club in Tanzania that invites foreign competitors to rally and compete for AMSC.

On August 10, 2022, Arusha held the 44th CAF Ordinal General Assembly, which also included the launch of the new Africa Super League.

In popular culture
Arusha was the setting for the 1962 film Hatari!, directed by Howard Hawks and starring John Wayne. Parts of the film were shot at Momela Lakes.

Arusha is alleged to be midway between Cape Town and Cairo.

Notable residents 
Edward Lowassa, Chama Cha Mapinduzi, politician and former Prime Minister of Tanzania
Peter K. Palangyo, diplomat and novelist, author of the novel Dying in the Sun
Peter Gordon Hines (Civil Engineer) born Arusha 1944.

Sister cities
  Durham, North Carolina, United States
  Kansas City, Missouri, United States
  Mürzzuschlag, Austria
  Tifariti, Western Sahara

See also

 Arusha Accords
 Arusha Cultural Heritage Centre
 Arusha Declaration
 Arusha National Park
 Arusha Region
 Lake Manyara
 Longido
 Mount Meru (Tanzania)
 Selian
 Tanzania
 United Nations Security Council resolution

References

External links 

 David Marsh's Childhood Map of European Area of Arusha, ca. 1956

 
Populated places in Arusha Region
Cities in Tanzania
Regional capitals in Tanzania
1900 establishments in German East Africa